Catalino is a surname or given name. Notable people with the name include: 

surname
Gina Catalino (born 1984),American folk-pop singer/songwriter
Grant Catalino, American lacrosse player

given name
Catalino Cuy (born 1957), Filipino police director
Catalino Macaraig Jr. (1927–2003), Filipino politician
Catalino Luis Roy Ortiz, Paraguayan Minister of National Defense
Catalino Duarte Ortuño (born 1970), Mexican politician
Catalino Rivarola (born 1965), Paraguayan football player